LeRoy Robert Ripley (December 25, 1890 – May 27, 1949) was an American cartoonist, entrepreneur, and amateur anthropologist, who is known for creating the Ripley's Believe It or Not! newspaper panel series, television show, and radio show, which feature odd facts from around the world.

Subjects covered in Ripley's cartoons and text ranged from sports feats to little-known facts about unusual and exotic sites. He also included items submitted by readers, who supplied photographs of a wide variety of small-town American trivia ranging from unusually shaped vegetables to oddly marked domestic animals, all documented by photographs and then depicted by his drawings.

Biography
LeRoy Robert Ripley was born around December 25, 1890, in Santa Rosa, California, although his exact birthdate is disputed. He dropped out of high school after his father's death to help his family, and at age 16, he began working as a sports cartoonist for various newspapers. In 1913, he moved to New York City. While drawing cartoons for The New York Globe newspaper, he created his first “Believe It or Not!” cartoon, published in the December 19, 1918, issue. With a positive response from readers, the cartoon began appearing weekly.

In 1919, Ripley married fourteen-year-old film actress Beatrice Roberts, a child 15 years his junior. He made his first trip around the world in 1922, publishing his travel journal in the newspapers. He became fascinated with unusual and exotic foreign locales and cultures. Because he took the veracity of his claims quite seriously, in 1923, he hired a researcher and polyglot named Norbert Pearlroth as a full-time assistant. In 1926, Ripley's cartoons moved from the New York Globe to the New York Post.

Throughout the 1920s, Ripley continued to broaden the scope of his work and his popularity increased greatly. He published a guide to the game of American handball in 1925. In 1926, he became the New York State handball champion and also wrote a book on boxing. With a proven track record as a versatile writer and artist, he attracted the attention of publishing mogul William Randolph Hearst, who managed the King Features Syndicate. In 1929, Hearst was responsible for Believe It or Not! making its syndicated debut in 17 papers worldwide. With the success of this series assured, Ripley capitalized on his fame by getting the first book collection of his newspaper panel series published.

On November 3, 1929, he drew a panel in his syndicated cartoon saying "Believe It or Not, America has no national anthem." Despite the widespread belief that "The Star-Spangled Banner", with its lyrics by Francis Scott Key set to the music of the English drinking song "To Anacreon in Heaven", was the United States national anthem, Congress had never officially made it so. In 1931, John Philip Sousa published his opinion in favor of giving the song official status, stating, "it is the spirit of the music that inspires" as much as it is Key's "soul-stirring" words. By a law signed on March 3, 1931, by President Herbert Hoover, "The Star-Spangled Banner" was adopted as the national anthem of the United States.

Ripley prospered during the Great Depression, netting $500,000 a year by the end of the 1930s. He employed a large staff of researchers, artists, translators, and secretaries to handle a deluge of suggestions for new oddities to report – and he traveled the world in search of curiosities and expanded his media to include radio and Hollywood. He started building museums in major cities. Funding for Ripley's highly publicized global travels were provided by the Hearst organization. Always in search of the bizarre, he recorded live radio shows underwater and from the sky, the Carlsbad Caverns, the bottom of the Grand Canyon, snake pits, and other exotic locales. The next year, he hosted the first of a series of two dozen Believe It or Not! theatrical short films for Warner Bros. and Vitaphone, and King Features published a second collected volume of Believe it or Not! panels. He also appeared in a Vitaphone musical short, Seasons Greetings (1931), with Ruth Etting, Joe Penner, Ted Husing, Thelma White, Ray Collins, and others. After a trip to Asia in 1932, he opened his first museum, the Odditorium, in Chicago in 1933. The concept was a success, and at one point, Odditoriums were in San Diego, Dallas, Cleveland, San Francisco, and New York City. By this point in his life, Ripley had been voted the most popular man in America by The New York Times, and Dartmouth College awarded him an honorary degree.

World travel became impossible during World War II, so Ripley concentrated on charity pursuit. In 1948, the year of the 20th anniversary of the Believe it or Not! cartoon series, the Believe it or Not! radio show drew to a close and was replaced with a Believe it or Not! television series. This was a rather bold move on Ripley's part, because of the small number of Americans with access to television at this early time in the medium's development. He completed only 13 episodes of the series before he became incapacitated by severe health problems. On May 27, 1949, at age 59, he succumbed to a heart attack in New York City. He was buried in his home town of Santa Rosa in the Oddfellows Lawn Cemetery, which is adjacent to the Santa Rosa Rural Cemetery.

The comic strip

Ripley's cartoon series was estimated to have 80 million readers worldwide, and  he is said to have received more mail than the President of the United States. He became a wealthy man, with homes in New York and Florida, but he always retained close ties to his home town of Santa Rosa, California, and he made a point of bringing attention to the Church of One Tree, a church built entirely from the wood of a single 300-ft (91.4-m)-tall redwood tree, which stands on the north side of Juilliard Park in downtown Santa Rosa.

Ripley claimed to be able to "prove every statement he made" because he worked with professional fact researcher Norbert Pearlroth, who assembled Believe it or Not!'''s array of odd facts and also verified the small-town claims submitted by readers. Pearlroth spent 52 years as the feature's researcher, finding and verifying unusual facts for Ripley, and after Ripley's death, for the King Features syndicate editors who took over management of the Believe it or Not! panel.
Another employee who edited the newspaper cartoon series over the years was Lester Byck. Others who drew the series after Ripley's death include Don Wimmer, Joe Campbell (1946-1956), Art Slogg, Clem Gretter (1941-1949), Carl Dorese, Bob Clarke (1943-1944), Stan Randall, Paul Frehm (1938–1975), who became the panel's full-time artist in 1949, and his brother Walter Frehm (1948–1989).

Legacy
Ripley's ideas and legacy live on in Ripley Entertainment, a company bearing his name and owned since 1985 by the Jim Pattison Group, Canada's largest privately held company. Ripley Entertainment airs national television shows, features publications of oddities, and has holdings in a variety of public attractions, including Ripley's Aquarium, Ripley's Believe it or Not! Museums, Ripley's Haunted Adventure, Ripley's Mini-Golf and Arcade, Ripley's Moving Theater, Ripley's Sightseeing Trains, Guinness World Records Attractions, and Louis Tussaud's Wax Museums.

Chronology

1890 Born in Santa Rosa, California
1901 Receives his formal education
1906 Becomes a semi-pro in school baseball
1908 Sells first cartoon to Life
1908 Quits baseball briefly to support mother
1909 Moves from the San Francisco Bulletin to the San Francisco Chronicle1912 Creates his last drawing for the San Francisco Chronicle and moves to New York City that winter
1913 On January 2, writes his first comic for the New York Globe and tries out for the New York Giants, but an injury ends his baseball hopes
1914 Takes his first trip to Europe
1918 On December 19, publishes "Champs and Chumps" in the New York Globe1919 Marries Beatrice Roberts
1920 Takes his first solo trip to Europe to cover the Olympics, held in Antwerp, Belgium
1922 On December 3, takes first trip around the world, writes in installments in his travel journal
1923 On April 7, returns to the U.S. and hires researcher and linguist Norbert Pearlroth; the Globe ceases publication and the series moves to the New York Evening News; divorces Beatrice Roberts after being separated for some time
1925 Writes travel journal, handball guide
1926 Becomes New York handball champion and writes book on boxing score
1929 On July 9, William Randolph Hearst's King Features Syndicate features Believe It or Not! in hundreds of papers worldwide
1930 Begins an 18-year run on radio and a 19-year association with show producer Doug Storer; Hearst funds Ripley's travels around the world, where Ripley records live radio shows from underwater, the sky, caves, snake pits and foreign countries
1931 Releases movie shorts for Vitaphone, second book of Believe it or Not!1932 Takes trip to the Far East
1933 First Odditorium opens in Chicago
1934 Does the first radio show broadcast simultaneously around the world and purchases 28-room home in Mamaroneck, New York
1935 Odditorium opens in San Diego
1936 Odditorium opens in Dallas
1937 Odditorium opens in Cleveland; Peanuts creator Charles Schulz's first published drawing appears in Believe it or Not!1939 Odditoriums open in San Francisco and New York City; Ripley receives honorary degree from Dartmouth College
1940 Purchases a 13-room Manhattan apartment; receives two more honorary degrees; number of foreign countries visited through funding by Hearst reaches 201
1945 Stops foreign travel to do World War II charity work
1946 Purchases a Chinese junk, the Mon Lei (万里)
1947 Purchases third home named Hi-Mount, at West Palm Beach, Florida
1948 Radio program ends; the 30th anniversary of Believe it or Not! is celebrated at a New York costume party
1949 Ripley dies of a heart attack on May 27 in New York City, shortly after 13th telecast of first television show, and is buried in Santa Rosa; auction of his estate is held; estate is purchased by John Arthur.

References

Further reading
 Considine, Bob. Ripley: The Modern Marco Polo (1961).
 Robbins, Peggy. "Ripley, Robert LeRoy" American National Biography'' (1999) https://doi.org/10.1093/anb/9780198606697.article.2000866

External links
Ripley's biography & timeline
 

Ripley Entertainment

Ripley's Believe It or Not!
Amateur anthropologists
American cartoonists
American entertainment industry businesspeople
Pseudoarchaeologists
People from Santa Rosa, California
1890 births
1949 deaths
20th-century American anthropologists